Shimon Menahem is a former Israeli footballer who turned to a multimillionaire as the CEO of the Scorpio real estate company

Honours
Championships
Runner-up (1): 1987-88
League Cup
Winner (1): 1983
Toto Cup
Runner-up (2): 1986–87, 1988–89
UEFA Intertoto Cup
Winner (1): 1984

Personal life
Shimon's older brother Yigal was a striker and both played together in Maccabi Netanya during the 1980s.

References

1964 births
Living people
Israeli Jews
Israeli footballers
Israel international footballers
Maccabi Netanya F.C. players
Liga Leumit players
Association football defenders